Larry LeRoy "Rube" Hartshorn (May 19, 1933 – September 19, 2007) was an American gridiron football player.  He played prolifically in the National Football League (NFL) as an offensive guard with the Chicago Cardinals in 1955 and 1957.  He later played in the Canadian Football League (CFL) with the Calgary Stampeders in 1958.

Hartshorn was born May 19, 1933, in Oil Hill, Kansas, near El Dorado, Kansas.  He became a distinguished athlete at El Dorado High School, earning All State honors in football in 1950.  He went on to play college football and baseball at Kansas State University from 1950 to 1954, where he was a teammate of Earl Woods.

Hartshorn's participation in the National Football League was interrupted when the U.S. Army  drafted him into service.  He served in the Army during 1955 and 1956 at Camp Zama, Japan, reaching the rank of Staff Sergeant.  When he completed his military service, he resumed professional football.

After his years in professional football and the military, Hartshorn moved to Concordia, Kansas, to become a teacher and coach for 33 years at Concordia Junior-Senior High School, where he coached Keith Christensen.  Hartshorn began the wrestling program in 1966, running it as head football coach from 1966 to 1974.  He continued to serve in various coaching and education capacities until his retirement.

References

1933 births
2007 deaths
American football offensive guards
American players of Canadian football
Canadian football offensive linemen
Chicago Cardinals players
Calgary Stampeders players
Kansas State Wildcats football players
High school football coaches in Kansas
United States Army soldiers
People from Butler County, Kansas
People from Concordia, Kansas
Players of American football from Kansas